A biconcave disc — also referred to as a discocyte — is a geometric shape resembling an oblate spheroid with two concavities on the top and on the bottom.

Biconcave discs appear in the study of cell biology, where it is meta-stable, and involves the continuous adjustment of the asymmetric transbilayer lipid distribution, which is correlated with ATP depletion.



Mathematical model

A biconcave disc can be described mathematically by

The above model describes a smooth surface; actual cells can be much more irregular.

Biology
Erythrocytes are in the shape of a biconcave disc. An erythrocyte is also known as a red blood cell and transports oxygen to and from tissues.

References

Cell biology
Geometric shapes